Luxa may refer to:

 Luxa (album), an album composed and performed by Harold Budd
 Luxa Flex Records, a Dutch record label
 Petr Luxa, a Czech tennis player
 Luxa, a NPC (non-player character) in Star Wars franchise CRPG. See. Knights of the Old Republic
 Luxa, a character from Suzanne Collins's Underland Chronicles
 Luxe-Sumberraute, a municipality in the region of Lower Navarre, Pyrenées-Atlantiques, France

Czech-language surnames